PPH may refer to

Medicine
 Portopulmonary hypertension
 Postpartum hemorrhage
 Primary pulmonary hypertension, see Pulmonary hypertension
 Procedure for prolapse and hemorrhoids, see Stapled hemorrhoidectomy

Science
 Pound per hour (symbol pph), mass flow unit (used in aviation to measure fuel flow, for instance)
 Part per hundred (percentage)
 People per hour, a measure of the rate of flow of people moving past a fixed point or through a system
 Propylphenidate, an analogue of methylphenidate

Organisations
 Patent Prosecution Highway, a set of cooperation agreements between some patent offices
 Permanent private hall, a type of educational institution affiliated to the University of Oxford
 Palomar Pomerado Health, a public health district in San Diego County, California
 PeoplePerHour

Transport
 Parai-tepuí Airport, Venezuela (by IATA code)